The Inter-State was a Brass Era car built in Muncie, Indiana by Inter-State Automobile Company from 1909 to 1919.

History

Company name
Thomas F. Hart announced in October 1908 the winning name of his new company, chosen via a contest.  The Inter-State Automobile Company set up shop at 142 Willard Street.  Ads stated "we could get more for this car."  Originally, all Inter-States were mid-market, both in size and price, with four-cylinder engines.  In 1913, 6-cylinder engines were added.

Receivership followed in the fall of 1913.  Thomas Hart cited "internal dissention and his inability to secure working capital because of disagreement among stockholders."  In February 1914, Frank C. Ball (one of the original Inter-State investors) bought the Inter-State factory and real estate.  This resulted in a renaming of the parent company to the Inter-State Motor Company.

General Motors
In 1915, a new Beaver 4-cylinder low-priced car was released.  By May 1918, automobile production was suspended in favor of war work.  In late February 1919, F. C. Ball announced he would be resuming passenger car production, but by March of the same year, Ball sold the Inter-State factory to General Motors for them to produce their new Sheridan.

Advertisements

See also
 Interstate Motor Cars at ConceptCarz

References

Defunct motor vehicle manufacturers of the United States
Motor vehicle manufacturers based in Indiana
Defunct companies based in Indiana
Vehicle manufacturing companies established in 1909
Vehicle manufacturing companies disestablished in 1919
1909 establishments in Indiana
Cars introduced in 1909
Brass Era vehicles
1910s cars